Coals of Fire may refer to:
 Coals of Fire (1915 film), directed by Tom Ricketts
 Coals of Fire (1918 film), directed by Victor Schertzinger